Baza Sportivă Dan Anca, formerly known as Baza Sportivă DROMEX or Baza Sportivă Detunata, is a multi-use stadium in Cluj-Napoca, Romania. The sport base was opened in 2011 on the place of old Baza Sportivă Detunata and it is used mostly for football matches, being the home ground of Viitorul Cluj. The stadium holds 1,000 people and is also used for Universitatea Cluj's youth center squads matches and trainings. Except of a main ground with a pitch of normal dimensions, covered with artificial turf, the complex contains several other football pitches with grass or artificial turf. The name of the stadium is in honour of footballer Dan Anca, who spent his entire career at Universitatea Cluj.

References

External links
 Baza Sportivă Dan Anca at Soccerway.com

Football venues in Romania
Buildings and structures in Cluj-Napoca
Sport in Cluj-Napoca